Universal Windows Platform (UWP) apps (formerly Windows Store apps, Metro-style apps and Modern apps) are applications that can be used across all compatible Microsoft Windows devices, including personal computers (PCs), tablets, smartphones, Xbox One, Microsoft HoloLens, and Internet of Things. These are primarily purchased and downloaded via the Microsoft Store.

Nomenclature
Starting with Windows 10, Windows initially used "Windows app" to refer to a UWP app. Any app installed from the Microsoft Store (formerly Windows Store) was initially "Trusted Windows Store app" and later "Trusted Microsoft Store apps." Other computer programs running on a desktop computer are "desktop apps." Starting with Windows 10 1903, Windows indiscriminately refers to all of them as "Apps."

The terms "Universal Windows Platform" (or "UWP") and "UWP app" only appear on Microsoft documentation for its developers. Microsoft started to retrospectively use "Windows Runtime app" to refer to the precursors of UWP app, for which there was no unambiguous name before.

In Windows 8.x 
Windows software first became available under the name "Metro-style apps" when the Windows Store opened in 2012 and was marketed with Windows 8.

Look and feel

In Windows 8.x, Metro-style apps do not run in a window. Instead, they either occupy the entire screen or are snapped to one side, in which case they occupy the entire height of the screen but only part of its width. They have no title bar, system menu, window borders or control buttons. Command interfaces like scroll bars are usually hidden at first. Menus are located in the "settings charm." Metro-style apps use the UI controls of Windows 8.x and typically follow Windows 8.x UI guidelines, such as horizontal scrolling and the inclusion of edge-UIs, like the app bar.

In response to criticism from customers, in Windows 8.1, a title bar is present but hidden unless users move the mouse cursor to the top of the screen. The "hamburger" menu button on their title bar gives access to the charms.

Distribution and licensing

For most users, the only point of entry for Metro-style apps is Windows Store. Enterprises operating a Windows domain infrastructure may enter into a contract with Microsoft that allows them to sideload their line-of-business Metro-style apps, circumventing Windows Store. Also, major web browser vendors such as Google and Mozilla Foundation are selectively exempted from this rule; they are allowed to circumvent Microsoft guidelines and Windows Store and run a Metro-style version of themselves if the user chooses to make their product the default web browser.

Metro-style apps are the only third-party apps that run on Windows RT. Traditional third-party apps do not run on this operating system.

Multiple copies
Before Windows 8, programs were identified by their static icons. Windows taskbar was responsible for representing every app that had a window when they run. Metro-style apps, however, are identified by their "tiles" that can show their icon and also other dynamic contents. In addition, in Windows 8 and Windows 8.1 RTM, they are not shown on the Windows taskbar when they run, but on a dedicated app switcher on the left side of the screen. Windows 8.1 Update added taskbar icons for Metro-style apps.

There is no set limit on how many copies of desktop apps can run simultaneously. For example, one user may run as many copies of programs such as Notepad, Paint or Firefox as the system resources support. (Some desktop apps, such as Windows Media Player, are designed to allow only a single instance, but this is not enforced by the operating system.) However, in Windows 8, only one copy of Metro-style apps may run at any given time; invoking the app brings the running instance to the front. True multi-instancing of these apps were not available until Windows 10 version 1803 (released in May 2018).

In Windows 10 and Windows 11 
Windows 10 brings significant changes to how UWP apps look and work.

Look and feel 

How UWP apps look depends on the app itself. UWP apps built specifically for Windows 10 and 11 typically have a distinct look and feel, as they use new UI controls that look different from those of previous versions of Windows. The exception to this are apps that use custom UI, which is especially the case with video games. Apps designed for Windows 8.x look significantly different from those designed for Windows 10 and 11.

UWP apps can also look almost identical to traditional desktop apps, using the same legacy UI controls from Windows versions dating back to Windows 95. These are legacy desktop apps that are converted to the UWP apps and distributed using the APPX file format.

Multitasking 
In Windows 10, most UWP apps, even those designed for Windows 8.x, are run in floating windows, and users use the Windows taskbar and Task View to switch between both UWP apps and desktop apps. Windows 10 also introduced "Continuum" or "Tablet Mode". This mode is by default disabled on desktop computers and enabled on tablet computers, but desktop users can switch it on or off manually. When the Tablet Mode is off, apps may have resizable windows and visible title bars. When the Tablet Mode is enabled, resizable apps use the windowing system similar to that of Metro-style apps on Windows 8.x in that they are forced to either occupy the whole screen or be snapped to one side.

UWP apps in Windows 10 can open in multiple windows. Microsoft Edge, Calculator, and Photos are examples of apps that allow this. Windows 10 v1803 (released in May 2018) added true multi-instancing capabilities, so that multiple independent copies of a UWP app can run.

Licensing and distribution 
UWP apps can be downloaded from Windows Store or sideloaded (using the app installer application from the Microsoft store). The sideloading requirements were reduced significantly from Windows 8.x to 10, but the app must still be signed by a trusted digital certificate that chains to a root certificate.

Lifecycle
Metro-style apps are suspended when they are closed; suspended apps are terminated automatically as needed by a Windows app manager. Dynamic tiles, background components and contracts (interfaces for interacting with other apps) may require an app to be activated before a user starts it.

Invoking an arbitrary Metro-style app or UWP app from the command line was first introduced in the Insider build 16226 of Windows 10, which was released on 21 June 2017.

Development

Windows Runtime
Traditionally, Windows software is developed using Windows API. Software has access to the Windows API with no arbitrary restrictions. Developers were free to choose their own programming language and development tools. Metro-style apps can only be developed using Windows Runtime (WinRT). (Note that not every app using WinRT is a Metro-style app.) A limited subset of WinRT is available for also conventional desktop apps. Calling a forbidden API disqualifies the app from appearing on Windows Store.

Metro-style apps can only be developed using Microsoft's own development tools. According to Allen Bauer, Chief Scientist of Embarcadero Technologies, there are APIs that every computer program must call but Microsoft has forbidden them, except when the call comes from Microsoft's own Visual C++ runtime.

Universal apps

Apps developed to work intrinsically on smartphones, personal computers, video game consoles and HoloLens are called universal apps. This is accomplished by using the universal app API, first introduced in Windows 8.1 and Windows Phone 8.1. Visual Studio 2013 with Update 2 could be used to develop these apps. Windows 10 introduced Universal Windows Platform (UWP) 10 for developing universal apps. Apps that take advantage of this platform are developed with Visual Studio 2015 or later. Older Metro-style apps for Windows 8.1, Windows Phone 8.1 or for both (universal 8.1) need modifications to migrate to this platform.

UWP is not distinct from Windows Runtime; rather, it is an extension of it. Universal apps no longer indicate having been written for a specific OS in their manifest; instead, they target one or more device families, e.g. desktop, mobile, Xbox or Internet of Things (IoT). They react to the capabilities that become available to the device. A universal app may run on both a small mobile phone and a tablet and provide a suitable experience. The universal app running on the mobile phone may start behaving the way it would on a tablet when the phone is connected to a monitor or a suitable docking station.

APPX

APPX is the file format used to distribute and install apps on Windows 8.x, 10, 11, Windows Phone 8.1, Windows 10 Mobile, Xbox One, Xbox Series X|S, Hololens, and Windows 10 IoT Core. Unlike legacy desktop apps, APPX is the only installation system allowed for UWP apps. It replaces the XAP file format on Windows Phone 8.1, in an attempt to unify the distribution of apps for Windows Phone and Windows 8. APPX files are only compatible with Windows Phone 8.1 and later versions, and with Windows 8 and later versions.

The Windows Phone 8.x Marketplace allows users to download APPX files to an SD Card and install them manually. In contrast, sideloading is prohibited on Windows 8.x, unless the user has a developers license or in a business domain.

Security
Traditional Windows applications have the power to use and change their ecosystem however they want to. Windows user account rights, User Account Control and antivirus software attempt to keep this ability in check and notify the user when the app tries to use it, possibly for malicious purposes. Metro-style apps, however, are sandboxed and cannot permanently change a Windows ecosystem. They need permission to access hardware devices such as webcams, microphones or their file system which is restricted to user folders, such as My Documents. Microsoft further moderates these programs and may remove them from the Windows Store if they are discovered to have security or privacy issues.

See also
Windows App Studio
WinJS

References

External links
 Index of Windows 10 apps

 
.NET
Computer-related introductions in 2012
Executable file formats
Windows APIs
Windows architecture
Windows technology